"I Didn't Know" is a song by Serhat from the Eurovision Song Contest 2016.

I Didn't Know may also refer to:

 "I Didn't Know", a song by Ph.D. from the album Is It Safe?, 1983
 "I Didn't Know", a song by Phish from the album Live Phish Volume 20, 2003
 "I Didn't Know", a 2010 song by Alex Lambert

See also
 I Don't Know (disambiguation)